In linear algebra, the column space (also called the range or image) of a matrix A is the span (set of all possible linear combinations) of its column vectors. The column space of a matrix is the image or range of the corresponding matrix transformation.

Let  be a field. The dimension of the column space is called the rank of the matrix and is at most . A definition for matrices over a ring  is also possible.

The row space is defined similarly.

This article considers matrices of real numbers.  The row and column spaces are subspaces of the real spaces  and  respectively.

Overview
Let  be an -by- matrix. Then
 ,

If , then .

The concept of row space generalizes to matrices over  the field of complex numbers, or over any field.

See singular value decomposition for more details on this second interpretation.

Example
Given a matrix :

the rows are
,
,
,
.
Since these four row vectors are linearly independent, the row space is 4-dimensional.

Column space

Definition

Let  be a field of scalars. Let  be an  matrix, with column vectors .  A linear combination of these vectors is any vector of the form

where  are scalars.

This is the same as the image (or range) of the corresponding matrix transformation.

Example 
A linear combination of v1 and v2 is any vector of the form

In this case, the column space is precisely the set of vectors  satisfying the equation  (using Cartesian coordinates, this set is a plane through the origin in three-dimensional space).

Basis
The columns of  span the column space, but they may not form a basis if the column vectors are not linearly independent.  Fortunately, elementary row operations do not affect the dependence relations between the column vectors.  This makes it possible to use row reduction to find a basis for the column space.

For example, consider the matrix

The columns of this matrix span the column space, but they may not be linearly independent, in which case some subset of them will form a basis.  To find this basis, we reduce  to reduced row echelon form:

At this point, it is clear that the first, second, and fourth columns are linearly independent, while the third column is a linear combination of the first two.  (Specifically, .)  Therefore, the first, second, and fourth columns of the original matrix are a basis for the column space:

Note that the independent columns of the reduced row echelon form are precisely the columns with pivots.  This makes it possible to determine which columns are linearly independent by reducing only to echelon form.

The above algorithm can be used in general to find the dependence relations between any set of vectors, and to pick out a basis from any spanning set.

To find the basis in a practical setting (e.g., for large matrices), the singular-value decomposition is typically used.

Dimension

The dimension of the column space is called the rank of the matrix.  The rank is equal to the number of pivots in the reduced row echelon form, and is the maximum number of linearly independent columns that can be chosen from the matrix.  For example, the 4 × 4 matrix in the example above has rank three.

Because the column space is the image of the corresponding matrix transformation, the rank of a matrix is the same as the dimension of the image.

The nullity of a matrix is the dimension of the null space, and is equal to the number of columns in the reduced row echelon form that do not have pivots.  The rank and nullity of a matrix  with  columns are related by the equation:

This is known as the rank–nullity theorem.

Relation to the left null space
The product of the matrix  and the vector  can be written in terms of the dot product of vectors:

For a matrix , the column space, row space, null space, and left null space are sometimes referred to as the four fundamental subspaces.

For matrices over a ring
Similarly the column space (sometimes disambiguated as right column space) can be defined for matrices over a ring  as

for any , with replacement of the vector -space with "right free module", which changes the order of scalar multiplication of the vector  to the scalar  such that it is written in an unusual order vector–scalar.

Row space

Definition
Let  be a field of scalars. Let  be an  matrix, with row vectors .  A linear combination of these vectors is any vector of the form

where  are scalars.

For example, if

In this case, the row space is precisely the set of vectors  satisfying the equation  (using Cartesian coordinates, this set is a plane through the origin in three-dimensional space).

For a matrix that represents a homogeneous system of linear equations, the row space consists of all linear equations that follow from those in the system.

Basis
The row space is not affected by elementary row operations.  This makes it possible to use row reduction to find a basis for the row space.

For example, consider the matrix

The rows of this matrix span the row space, but they may not be linearly independent, in which case the rows will not be a basis.  To find a basis, we reduce  to row echelon form:

Once the matrix is in echelon form, the nonzero rows are a basis for the row space. Another possible basis  comes from a further reduction.

This algorithm can be used in general to find a basis for the span of a set of vectors.  If the matrix is further simplified to reduced row echelon form, then the resulting basis is uniquely determined by the row space.

It is sometimes convenient to find a basis for the row space from among the rows of the original matrix instead (for example, this result is useful in giving an elementary proof that the determinantal rank of a matrix is equal to its rank).

Dimension

The dimension of the row space is called the rank of the matrix.  This is the same as the maximum number of linearly independent rows that can be chosen from the matrix, or equivalently the number of pivots.  For example, the 3 × 3 matrix in the example above has rank two.

The rank of a matrix is also equal to the dimension of the column space.  The dimension of the null space is called the nullity of the matrix, and is related to the rank by the following equation:

where  is the number of columns of the matrix .  The equation above is known as the rank–nullity theorem.

Relation to the null space
The product of the matrix  and the vector  can be written in terms of the dot product of vectors:

For example, if the row space is a plane through the origin in three dimensions, then the null space will be the perpendicular line through the origin. This provides a proof of the rank–nullity theorem (see dimension above).

The row space and null space are two of the four fundamental subspaces associated with a matrix  (the other two being the column space and left null space).

Relation to coimage
The kernel of a linear transformation is analogous to the null space of a matrix.

If  is an inner product space, then the orthogonal complement to the kernel can be thought of as a generalization of the row space.

When  is not an inner product space, the coimage of  can be defined as the quotient space .

See also
 Euclidean subspace

References & Notes

Further reading

External links

, MIT Linear Algebra Lecture on the Four Fundamental Subspaces at Google Video, from MIT OpenCourseWare
Khan Academy video tutorial
Lecture on column space and nullspace by Gilbert Strang of MIT
Row Space and Column Space

Abstract algebra
Linear algebra
Matrices